Wakulla may refer to:

Places
Wakulla Beach, Florida
Wakulla County, Florida
Wakulla, North Carolina
The Wakulla River in Florida
 Wakulla Springs

Ships
USS Wakulla (ID-3147), a United States Navy cargo ship in commission from 1918 to 1919 
USS Wakulla (AOG-44), a United States Navy gasoline tanker in commission from 1945 to 1946

Other
Wakulla Correctional Institution, a prison southwest of Tallahassee, Florida
Wakulla County Airport in Wakulla County, Florida
Wakulla High School in Crawfordville, Florida
Wakulla (moth), a moth in the family Pyralidae